General Sir Thomas Montagu Steele  (11 May 1820, Guilsborough, Northamptonshire – 25 February 1890 Frimley Park, Farnborough) was a British army officer.

Life
As the eldest son of Major-General Thomas Steele and Lady Elizabeth Montagu, second daughter of the fifth duke of Manchester, he attended Royal Military College, Sandhurst, before being commissioned as an ensign in the 64th foot in January 1838. Exchanging into the Coldstream Guards on 20 July that year, he served as aide-de-camp to the governor of Madras (1842–48) rose to lieutenant in 1844, captain later that year and brevet lieutenant-colonel in 1851. Promoted to brevet colonel in 1854, he served as Lord Raglan and his successor's military secretary (1854–1855, apart from 5 July to 6 August 1855 when Steele served as assistant adjutant general – in that role he served at the battles of the Alma, Balaklava, Inkerman and Sevastopol, being mentioned in dispatches).

His rewards for his Crimean War service were promotion to brevet colonel (1854) and aide-de-camp to Queen Victoria (1855), appointment as a commander of the Order of the Bath (1855), the Order of the Mejidiye (third class), the Legion of Honour (fifth class), and the order of St Maurice and St Lazarus (second class).  He married his first wife Isabel Fitzgerald in 1856 and, on her death 2 years later, he remarried in 1865 to the American Rosalie Malvina McCarty of New York. Steele was promoted to the substantive rank of major in 1860 and the substantive rank of lieutenant colonel in 1862 before retiring to half pay on 24 November 1863. He was promoted to major-general in 1865 and then commanded the troops in the Dublin district (1 April 1872 – 31 March 1874). Promoted to lieutenant general in 1874, he commanded the Aldershot Division (14 April 1875 – 30 June 1880) and, having been promoted to full general in 1877, he commanded the British forces in Ireland (1880–85), finally retiring in 1887. He died in 1890 and was survived by his second wife.

References

External links 

|-
 

1820 births
1890 deaths
Military personnel from Northamptonshire
61st Regiment of Foot officers
People from West Northamptonshire District
British Army personnel of the Crimean War
Commanders-in-Chief, Ireland
British Army generals
Coldstream Guards officers
Gloucestershire Regiment officers
Graduates of the Royal Military College, Sandhurst
Knights Grand Cross of the Order of the Bath
Recipients of the Order of the Medjidie
Members of the Privy Council of Ireland